Friedberger Baggersee is a lake in Augsburg Swabia, Bavaria, Germany. At an elevation of 480 m, its surface area is 18 ha.

Lakes of Bavaria